Fabrizio Gallo (died 5 November 1614) was a Roman Catholic prelate who served as Bishop of Nola (1585–1614).

Biography
On 1 July 1585, Fabrizio Gallo, he was appointed during the papacy of Pope Sixtus V as Bishop of Nola.
On 21 September 1585, he was consecrated bishop by Giulio Antonio Santorio, Cardinal-Priest of San Bartolomeo all'Isola, Angelo di Cipro, Bishop Emeritus of Santorini, Marco Antonio del Tufo, Bishop of San Marco, serving as co-consecrators. 
He served as Bishop of Nola until his death on 5 November 1614.

References

External links and additional sources
 (for Chronology of Bishops) 
 (for Chronology of Bishops) 

16th-century Italian Roman Catholic bishops
17th-century Italian Roman Catholic bishops
Bishops appointed by Pope Sixtus V
1614 deaths